Welwitschiella is a genus of African plants in the aster tribe within the daisy family.

Species
There is only one known species, Welwitschiella neriifolia, native to Angola, Zaïre, and Zambia.

References

Astereae
Monotypic Asteraceae genera
Flora of Africa
Athroismeae